Puerto Rico Highway 115 (PR-115) is a highway which follows the west coastline of Puerto Rico from south Añasco at PR-2 to near downtown Aguadilla, where it becomes Puerto Rico Highway 111 after intersecting PR-2 again, and is the primary route to the town of Rincón, Puerto Rico, a tourist and frequent destination of surfers.

Route description
As it enters Rincón, PR-115 becomes a divided highway with one lane per direction, with the median filled with trees, similar to some of the medians found in freeways in the United States. But PR-115 is not a freeway; it is a rural highway mostly one lane per direction. It enters toward downtown Rincón. The highway is subject to severe flooding when it rains.

Major intersections

See also

 List of highways numbered 115

References

External links
 

115